Emeric Chantier (born 1986, Montreuil) is a French sculptor. He integrates the place and the condition of humans in nature in a trans-generational, universal and atemporal fashion.

Career 

Chantier's career began in 2006 in workshops in teams of artists performing decorative works for architects, private individuals and prestigious brands. He learnt sculpture and integrated the techniques of "model making". He began producing works that borrowed from humanism, poetry, and commitment.

Technique 

Chantier is a self-taught artist who relies on molding and gluing techniques. Integrating dried vegetables and industrial and household materials, he assembles and diverts the elements to compose works that offer multiple readings, both in form and in meaning.

Chantier commented about his work:

Exhibitions 

 2016: De Humanum Natura, A2Z Art Gallery, Paris, France
 2016: "Art Paris Art Fair", represented among others by A2Z Art Gallery, Grand Palais, Paris, France
 2016: Etat second, (collective exhibition, A2Z Art Gallery, Paris, France.
 2015: "OFF Art Fair Bruxelles", Macadam Gallery, Belgium
 2015: "9e élément", Macadam Gallery, Belgium
 2015: St'art, Macadam Gallery, Belgium
 2015: Macadam Gallery (collective exhibition), 
 2015: Belgique Galerie Sebban – exposition collective 
 2014: "OFF Art Fair Bruxelles", Macadam Gallery, Belgium
 2014: Youngs & Contemporary, Macadam Gallery, Belgium
 2014: Lille Art Up, Macadam Gallery, Belgium
 2014: Summer of Colors, Macadam Gallery, Belgium
 2013: MAC Paris, Espace Champerret
 2013: AAF, Macadam Gallery, Belgium
 2013: Galerie Arnaud Bard (collective exhibition), Boulogne-Billancourt, France
 2013: Galerie 13 (collective exhibition), Montpellier, France

References

External links 

1976 births
Living people
French sculptors